Die großen Kriminalfälle ("The Great Criminal Cases") is a German documentary television series. It first aired in 2000, since then 41 episodes have been produced. Each episode is about one famous criminal case in German post-war history.

External links
 

2000 German television series debuts
2012 German television series endings
German-language television shows
Das Erste original programming